Kot Solankiyan is a village located in the Desuri tehsil in the Pali district of Rajasthan, India. It is located near Sadri town on State Highway 62 between Jojawar and Bagol, in a valley on the western side of the Aravalli Range. Kot is easily accessed by road from Jojawar, Desuri and Dewair.

External links 
2001 Census of India: Village directory

Villages in Pali district